The Bureaus of the Cortes Generales are the governing bodies of each House of the Cortes Generales, the legislative branch of Spain. The Bureaus are made up of the President or Speaker of the House, the Vice Presidents or Deputy Speakers and the Secretaries. Each Bureau is autonomously regulated by the standing orders of its House and its composition its not the same.

In the constitutive session of the Cortes Generales, both Bureaus are replaced by Age Bureaus, a temporary body composed by the oldest member of the House which acts as Acting Speaker and two secretaries which are the youngest members of the House. This Age Bureaus oversee the electoral process of the Permanent Bureaus. The Bureaus members are elected among and by the members of the Houses by means of secret ballot and ensuring political plurality.

Members

Speaker 

The Speakers or Presidents of the respective House and are the supreme authority within its Chamber and they chair the Chamber's Bureau.

Deputy Speakers 
The Deputy Speakers or Vice Presidents are numbered and they deputize, in order of precedence, for the Speaker. This shall happen in cases of vacancy, absence or impossibility of the latter.

Secretaries 
The Secretaries supervise and authorize, with the approval of the Speaker, the Minutes of the Plenary sessions, of the Bureau and of the Board of Spokespersons, as well as the certifications that have to be issued, they assist the Speaker in the sessions to ensure order in the debates and the correction in the votes; they collaborate in the normal development of the works of their House according to the provisions of the Speaker; and they also exercise any other functions entrusted to them by the Speaker or the Bureau.

Senate 

The Spanish Senate is the upper house of the Cortes Generales and its standing orders were passed on 3 May 1994 and they have been modified at least twenty times.

According to the current regulation, the Bureau acts under the authority and direction of the Speaker. The Senate Bureau must to be elected in the constitutive session and it is composed by the President of the Senate, two Vice Presidents and two Secretaries (Part I § 2).

The functions of the Bureau of the Senate are (Part III § 36):

 To fix the starting and the closing dates for the periods of sessions of the Senate.
 To determine the timetable of activities of the Plenary Sitting and the Committees for each period of sessions.
 To assess, according to the Standing Orders, the parliamentary deeds and documents, and decide on their admissibility and the further action to be taken thereon.
 To take such decisions and measures as may be required for the organisation of tasks and the internal governance and system of the Senate.
 To approve the Budget Bill of the Senate, directing and controlling its implementation and approving any amendments and its liquidation.
 To approve regulations that adapt the general provisions of the legal system on matters pertaining to the budget, control, accounting and procurement to the organisation and functioning of the Senate.
 To approve regulations and to adopt any measures necessary to ensure the transparency of the activities of the Senate and the right of access to public information of the House.
 Any other that may be provided for by the existing laws and the Standing Orders.

Congress of Deputies 
The Congress of Deputies is the lower house of the Cortes Generales and its standing orders were passed on 24 February 1982 and they have been modified at least twelve times.

According to the current regulation, the Bureau of the Congress is directed and coordinated by the Speaker of the Congress of Deputies. Because of the large size of the Congress compared to the Senate, the Bureau of the Congress is composed by the Speaker of the Congress, acting as chairperson, four Deputy Speakers and four Secretaries (Part III § 30).

The functions of the Bureau of the Congress of Deputies are (Part III § 31):

 To adopt such decisions and measures as are required for the arrangement of business and the internal regulation and management of the House.
 To prepare the Budget Bill of the Congress, supervise and oversee its implementation and submit to the Plenary, at the end of each year, a report as to its fulfilment.
 To order the expenses of the House, without prejudice to the possibility of delegate its authority on this matter.
 To assess parliamentary papers and documents, in accordance with the Standing Orders, and to declare the admissibility or inadmissibility thereof.
 To decide upon the consideration of all parliamentary papers and documents in accordance with the provisions of these Standing Orders.
 To arrange the general proceedings of the Congress, draw up the order of business of plenary sittings and of committees for each session and coordinate the business of the various bodies, upon previous consultation in each case with the Board of Spokespersons.
 Any other that may be provided for by the existing laws and the Standing Orders.

Other bureaus 
Each House of the Cortes Generales has their own Committees and at the same time this committees are governed by their own Bureau. As a general rule, both Senate Committees and Congressional Committees and are composed by a Chairperson, two Deputy Chairpersons and two Secretaries all of them elected from the committee members.

There are some exceptions where the chairperson of some committees is not elected. This is the case for the Rules Committee of each House which is chaired by the Speaker of the House and the General Committee for the Autonomous Communities in the Senate, which is chaired by the Senate Speaker.

References

External links 
 Senate Standing Orders in English.
 Congress of Deputies Standing Orders in English.

Cortes Generales
Congress of Deputies (Spain)
Senate of Spain
Presiding bodies of legislatures